The Dog Stars is a post-apocalyptic fiction novel by Peter Heller. Set in Colorado, a man lives a lonesome existence in an airplane hangar with his dog and a dour gunman he has befriended. When a mysterious transmission comes through on the radio while he’s flying his old Cessna, it sparks a hunt for the provenance of the sound.

Reception

NPR described the novel as crackerjack and said "With its soulful hero, macabre villains, tender (if thin) love story and action scenes staggered at perfectly spaced intervals, the story unfolds with the vigor of the film it will undoubtedly become. But it also succeeds as a dark, poetic and funny novel in its own right."

The Boston Globe also had praise for the novel, stating, "Peter Heller serves up an insightful account of physical, mental, and spiritual survival unfolded in dramatic and often lyrical prose, a difficult tale in which unexpected hope persistently flickers amid darkness."

References

American post-apocalyptic novels
2012 American novels
Alfred A. Knopf books
Novels about dogs
Novels set in Colorado